Congress on Research in Dance was a professional organization for dance historians in the United States and worldwide that was founded in 1964 and then merged in 2017 with the Society of Dance History Scholars to form the Dance Studies Association (DSA).

An international non-profit learned society for dance researchers, artists, performers and choreographers, CORD published the Dance Research Journal and sponsored annual conferences and awards for scholarship and contributions to the field. The journal and awards have been absorbed into the DSA.

History
The society was founded in 1964 as the Committee on Research in Dance, and based at New York University. It was formally incorporated as a 501 (c)(3) not-for-profit organization in 1969. The organization changed its name to Congress on Research in Dance in 1977. In 1991, it moved to the State University of New York College at Brockport. In 2007, the CORD National Office moved to the care of Prime Management Services based in Birmingham, Alabama. Membership generally includes performers, choreographers, artists and dance academics from colleges and universities.

Dance Research Journal

The Dance Research Journal is a triannual peer-reviewed academic journal publishing scholarly articles, book reviews, and other reports of interest to the field of dance research, with its primary orientation being towards the historical and critical theory of dance. The journal was published by Cambridge University Press on behalf of the Congress on Research in Dance until the merger in 2017. Now it is on behalf of the Dance Studies Association. The journal was established in 1969 as CORD News.

The journal is abstracted and indexed in Academic ASAP, Academic Search Elite, Academic Search Premier, Expanded Academic, Humanities Index, Index to Dance Periodicals, International Index to Performing Arts, and ProQuest.

Awards issued

Outstanding Contribution to Dance Research
 1996, Joann Kealiinohomoku
 1997, Ann Hutchinson Guest
 1998, Kapila Vatsyayan
 2000, Ivor Guest
 2001, Deborah Jowitt
 2003, Sally Banes
 2005, Marcia Siegel
 2007, Robert Farris Thompson
 2008, Joan Acocella
 2009, none awarded
 2010, Stephanie Jordan
 2011, Mark Franko
 2012, Sue Stinson
 2013, Susan Manning
 2014, Deidre Sklar
 2015, Janice Ross
 2016, Randy Martin, in memoriam
 2017, Thomas F. DeFrantz

Outstanding Leadership in Dance Research
 1995, Carl Wolz
 1996, Gigi Oswald
 1997, Selma Jeanne Cohen
 1998, Vicki Risner
 1999, Ernestine Stodelle
 2000, David Vaughan
 2001, Beate Gordon
 2003, Jane Bonbright
 2005, Katherine Dunham and Anna Halprin
 2006, Elsie Ivancich Dunin and Allegra Fuller Snyder
 2007, Susan Leigh Foster
 2008, Brenda Dixon Gottschild
 2009, none awarded
(now the Dixie Durr Award for Outstanding Service to Dance Research)
 2010, Ann Dils 
 2011, Barbara Sellers-Young
 2012, Cara Gargano
 2013, Sally Ness
 2014, Libby Smigel
 2015 Elizabeth Aldrich
 2016 Jacqueline Shea Murphy
 2017, Ann Cooper Albright

Other CORD awards include one for "Outstanding Book", such as one for Marta Savigliano.

See also 
 Timeline of music in the United States (1950 - 1969)
 American Dance Guild
 Society of Dance History Scholars

References

Further reading 
 Kealiinohomoku, Joann W. and Mary Jane Warner, "Dance", pgs. 206 - 226, in the Garland Encyclopedia of World Music

External links 
 
 Dance Research Journal at Project MUSE

Dance organizations
Arts organizations established in 1965
Dance awards
Learned societies of the United States
Dance research
Cambridge University Press academic journals
Arts journals
Publications established in 1968
Triannual journals
English-language journals
Academic journals associated with learned and professional societies